Kazumba may refer to:

Kazumba, Kasai-Occidental, a settlement in Kasai-Occidental province of the Democratic Republic of the Congo
Kazumba, Katanga, a settlement in Katanga province of the Democratic Republic of the Congo
Kazumba Territory, a territory in Kasai-Occidental province of the Democratic Republic of the Congo